ToonBangla is a Bangladeshi animation studio based in Dhaka. ToonBangla's notable productions include Murgi Keno Mutant, animation for some Meena episodes, etc.

References 

Bangladeshi animation studios